Zander Lombard (born 18 January 1995) is a South African professional golfer.

Amateur career
As an amateur, Lombard won several events in Africa and represented South Africa in the Eisenhower Trophy in 2012 and 2014. In 2014, he was runner-up at The Amateur Championship, losing to Bradley Neil in the final, 2 and 1. He turned professional in late 2014.

Professional career
Lombard earned a spot in the 2016 Open Championship after a second-place finish at the Joburg Open, an Open Qualifying Series event. He made the cut and finished tied for 66th.

Lombard was runner-up in the 2017 Rocco Forte Open in Sicily, losing to Álvaro Quirós at the second hole of a sudden-death playoff.

After a poor start to 2018, Lombard tied for 6th place in the Dubai Duty Free Irish Open. This also gave him a place in the 2018 Open Championship where he finished tied for 67th. In August he won the Vodacom Origins (Zebula) on the Sunshine Tour.

Amateur wins
2011 South African U16 Strokeplay
2012 North West Open
2013 Namibian Open, Kwazulu-Natal Amateur Championship, IGT Winter Challenge Centurion

Source:

Professional wins (9)

Sunshine Tour wins (1)

Sunshine Tour playoff record (1–0)

IGT Pro Tour wins (8)

Playoff record
European Tour playoff record (0–1)

Results in major championships
Results not in chronological order in 2020.

 

CUT = missed the half-way cut
"T" = tied
NT = No tournament due to the COVID-19 pandemic

Results in World Golf Championships

1Cancelled due to COVID-19 pandemic

NT = no tournament
"T" = tied

Team appearances
Amateur
Eisenhower Trophy (representing South Africa): 2012, 2014

See also
2018 European Tour Qualifying School graduates

References

External links

South African male golfers
Sunshine Tour golfers
European Tour golfers
Sportspeople from Pretoria
1995 births
Living people
21st-century South African people